Dulangan-e Sofla (also Romanized as Dūlangān-e Soflá; also known as Dolangān-e Pā’īn, Dolangān-e Soflá, and Dūlgān-e Pā’īn) is a village in Qaleh Shahin Rural District, in the Central District of Sarpol-e Zahab County, Kermanshah Province, Iran. At the 2006 census, its population was 359, in 84 families.

References 

Populated places in Sarpol-e Zahab County